Butte Valley Airport  is a county-owned public-use airport located five miles (8 km) southwest of the central business district of Dorris, in Siskiyou County, California, United States.

Facilities and aircraft 
For the 12-month period ending December 31, 2005, the airport had 2,000 general aviation aircraft operations, an average of 5 per day.

References

External links
Butte Valley Airport at Siskiyou County web site

Airports in Siskiyou County, California